The 2017–18 South Carolina State Bulldogs basketball team represented South Carolina State University during the 2017–18 NCAA Division I men's basketball season. The Bulldogs, led by fifth-year head coach Murray Garvin, played their home games at the SHM Memorial Center in Orangeburg, South Carolina as members of the Mid-Eastern Athletic Conference. They finished the season 10–22, 6–10 in MEAC play to finish in 10th place. They lost to Morgan State in the first round of the MEAC tournament.

Previous season
The Bulldogs finished the 2016–17 season 11–20, 7–9 in MEAC play to finish in a three-way tie for seventh place. They defeated Florida A&M in the MEAC tournament before losing in the quarterfinals to Norfolk State.

Roster

Schedule and results

|-
!colspan=9 style=| Exhibition

|-
!colspan=9 style=| Non-conference regular season

|-
!colspan=9 style=| MEAC regular season

|-
!colspan=9 style=|MEAC tournament

References

South Carolina State Bulldogs basketball seasons
South Carolina State